is a 1989 mahjong video game developed by Intelligent Systems and published by Nintendo for its handheld Game Boy as one of the Japanese launch titles. It is the first entry in a series of first-party Japanese mahjong games on Nintendo systems, with sequels on the Famicom, Game Boy Advance, DS, Wii, Wii U, and 3DS.

Summary

As one of the four original Game Boy games available for the Japanese launch of that system on April 21, 1989, Yakuman was released alongside Alleyway, Super Mario Land, and Baseball. It is the only game of the four that was never released outside Japan. It has both a single player mode and a two player versus mode. 

Japanese mahjong is a four player tile-based game where the goal is to take points from other players by drawing and discarding tiles until a winning hand is made. A "Yakuman" is a class of rare and valuable winning hands that can be composed of different combinations of tiles than normal hands. The mahjong in Yakuman is a two player variation of this game.

Legacy
The Yakuman Player as seen on the cover art appears as a collectible sticker in Super Smash Bros. Brawl. He appears again, as a spirit, in Super Smash Bros. Ultimate.

References

External links
Official website

1989 video games
Mahjong video games
Game Boy games
Game Boy-only games
Nintendo franchises
Nintendo games
Intelligent Systems games
Japan-exclusive video games
Multiplayer and single-player video games
Nintendo Switch Online games
Video games developed in Japan
Video games scored by Hirokazu Tanaka